Arat is a fictional character from the horror drama television series, The Walking Dead, which airs on the US channel AMC. Arat was played by actress Elizabeth Ludlow. The character is an adaptation of Tara from The Walking Dead comics.

Character biography
Arat is a female member of the Saviors, commissioned by Negan to confiscate the supplies, weapons, and furniture of Alexandria. When the war against Negan ends, Arat surrenders and makes peace with the allied communities.

Season 7

In the episode "The Cell", Arat radios Dwight to inform him that the worker named Gordon had fled the Sanctuary, but Negan answers and tells her that Dwight will meet her at the gate. In the next episode "Service", Arat is among the Saviors that raid Alexandria and she gives the order to begin looting. She accompanies Negan and the others as they raid the armory, and discovers a discrepancy with the inventory list. She suggests to Negan that Olivia may be lying about the number of guns present. In the mid-season finale "Hearts Still Beating", Arat is among the Saviors that raid Alexandria again. Spencer asks to speak to Negan, and Arat rejects him twice before Negan comes out from Rick's house and agrees to talk with Spencer. Spencer attempts to get Negan to eliminate Rick, however, Negan disembowels Spencer in response. Rosita attempts to shoot Negan but misses and instead hits Lucille. Arat subdues Rosita while Negan demands to know who made the bullet. When Rosita lies and claims she did, Negan tells Arat to kill someone. Arat chooses to kill Olivia. After Rick returns to Alexandria, Negan orders Arat to select her next victim until someone reveals the bullet maker. Eugene admits to making the bullet. Arat and the rest of the Saviors leave, taking Eugene with them. 
In the season finale "The First Day of the Rest of Your Life", Arat is among the Saviors that travel to Alexandria with Negan. When the Alexandrians get the upper hand and start firing at the Saviors, Arat and the others duck behind their trucks and fight back. When the Hilltop and the Kingdom arrive to help, Arat and the other Saviors retreat.

Season 8

In the episode "The Big Scary U", Arat is present as the Savior lieutenants discuss how to rescue Negan after the Alexandrian counterattack, how to handle the workers, and the possibility of a spy among their ranks. Laura bursts into the room, warning everyone that the workers are marching upstairs and that they will not back down. Arat and the others try to calm the angry workers down. She takes a knee when Negan returns.

In the episode "The Key", Arat is part of the Savior army dispatched to the Hilltop to use their weapons coated with walker-viscera when Rick attacks the convoy. Arat and the others are eager to find Negan, but Simon assures them that he and Dwight will find Negan instead. When they return to the Saviors empty-handed, Arat questions Negan's whereabouts. Simon gives a speech about continuing Negan's plan and vision, and Arat cheers along with the other Saviors. In the next episode "Do Not Send Us Astray", Arat and the other Saviors arrive at the Hilltop. After several vehicles lose their tires due to tire spikes, Arat removes the spikes from the road so they can advance further. She and the others are met with gunfire from the Hilltop but she escapes with Simon, Dwight, and the remaining Saviors. In the episode "Worth", Arat helps plan the final assault on the Hilltop now that Negan has returned. Later, she is among the Saviors to execute the other Saviors planning to overthrow Negan. She also witnesses the fist-fight between Negan and Simon, and Simon's death. She helps capture and disarm Dwight, who Laura reveals to be a mole working with Rick.

Season 9 

In the season premiere "A New Beginning", Arat and Justin string up a walker as a scarecrow in the crop field at the Sanctuary. Daryl asks what they are doing and Arat explains, but Daryl kills the walker with an arrow to the head. In the next episode "The Bridge", Arat is with Rosita as they rig charges to lure a herd away from the bridge construction site. Arat asks Rosita if she could wire the explosives and when she was denied the opportunity, she asks Rosita if she trusts her. Rosita replies that she does not trust Arat, especially after she held a knife to her face and cut her face. In the next episode "Warning Signs", Arat is captured by Cyndie and other survivors from Oceanside, who reveal that Arat was one of the soldiers ordered by Simon to kill the men of their community, and Arat specifically killed Cyndie's 11-year-old brother. Daryl and Maggie find them just as they are about to execute a tearful Arat who insists that she had no choice and has changed. After Arat admits that she told Cyndie "no exceptions" when Cyndie begged for her brother's life, Maggie and Daryl walk away. Cyndie then impales Arat in the head with a spear, killing her and avenging her brother in the same spot Arat murdered the boy.

Development and reception
During a Twitter chat with fans, actress Elizabeth Ludlow stated that "I think Arat was always an independent woman but losing her family and friends changed her." She also used the words "#Survivor" "#Independent" and "#Misunderstood" to describe the character. She received negative reactions for killing fan-favorite character Olivia: "I did receive my fair share of negativity for killing Olivia but it was expected. She was an extremely loved character so I had an expectation of negativity when I read the script for that day. The love I have received and continue to receive heavily outweighs the negativity though so it's easy not to pay attention to that stuff."

Arat is killed in the ninth-season episode "Warning Signs". Entertainment Weekly noted that although Arat had become one "of the more cooperative members of the Sanctuary", the Oceansiders killed her "after Cyndie told them the story of how Arat killed her 11-year-old sibling, of how Arat smiled when she did it and replied to Cyndie's begs with 'no exceptions'". Forbes commented that "when Cindy explains that Arat killed her mom and her brother---an 11-year-old boy who she killed with a smile and the words "No exceptions"---Daryl and Maggie turn and walk away. It's a great moment." TV Line commented that "Maggie and Daryl turned and walked away, leaving Arat to be murdered while screaming that she'd changed." Uproxx commented that "I'm not entirely sure that Maggie chose incorrectly.  Arat deserved to die for how she killed Cyndie's brother."

References

Female characters in television
Fictional henchmen
Fictional murderers
Fictional women soldiers and warriors
The Walking Dead (franchise) characters
The Walking Dead (TV series)